Just Because is the second full-length album by American band The Belle Brigade, whose members are siblings Barbara and Ethan Gruska. It was recorded with engineer and co-producer Shawn Everett and mastered by Bob Ludwig. The album was released on March 25, 2014.

The Belle Brigade's first album had received wide critical praise, but on their second album, the Gruskas wanted to pursue a less slickly produced and more individual sound. Their record company, Reprise Records, expressed dissatisfaction with the results, and ultimately the band took the record to independent ATO Records.

Reception

Critical reception has been mainly positive. Time praised the first single, "How I See It", as an "easygoing, exuberant song" that made a "perfect introduction to a California-dreaming band on the brink of making it big." In a four-star review, AllMusic said the album "doesn't break down any walls" but was a timeless-sounding collection of songs with contemporary tools" and "finesse". PopMatters rated the record 7/10, noting its "slightly darker indie edge" and finding the release to be "a clear step forward". Paste similarly noted the album's greater use of "modern synths and samples" but found it "just a little surprising that such a sad record can sound so blissfully blasé."

Track listing

Charts

Release history

References 

2014 albums
The Belle Brigade albums
ATO Records albums